German submarine U-263 was a Type VIIC U-boat of Nazi Germany's Kriegsmarine during World War II. The submarine was laid down on 8 June 1941 at the Bremer-Vulkan-Vegesacker Werft (yard) in Bremen as yard number 28. She was launched on 18 March 1942 and commissioned on 6 May under the command of Kapitänleutnant Kurt Nölke.

She was a member of one wolfpack.

She was sunk on 20 January 1944 in the Bay of Biscay, during a deep dive trial.

Design
German Type VIIC submarines were preceded by the shorter Type VIIB submarines. U-263 had a displacement of  when at the surface and  while submerged. She had two shafts and two  propellers.

U-263 was fitted with five  torpedo tubes (four fitted at the bow and one at the stern), fourteen torpedoes, one  SK C/35 naval gun, 220 rounds, and two twin  C/30 anti-aircraft guns. The boat had a complement of between forty-four and sixty.

Service history
After training with the 8th U-boat Flotilla, the boat became operational on 1 November 1942 when she was transferred to the 1st flotilla.

First patrol
U-263s first patrol began when she departed Kiel on 27 October 1942. She entered the Atlantic Ocean after negotiating the gap between Iceland and the Faroe Islands. There followed a series of attacks west of Gibraltar, first by the U-boat on two freighters, then on the submarine by surface ships (on 20 November), aircraft (on 24 November) and a submarine (on 26 November), all of which she was lucky to survive. Even so, the damage sustained needed 13 months of repairs. She arrived at La Pallice / La Rochelle in occupied France on 29 November.

Second patrol and loss
The boat departed La Pallice on 19 January 1944. She was sunk the next day in the Bay of Biscay during a deep dive trial.

Fifty-one men died; there were no survivors.

Summary of raiding history

References

Bibliography

External links

World War II submarines of Germany
German Type VIIC submarines
U-boats commissioned in 1942
1942 ships
Ships built in Bremen (state)
Ships lost with all hands
U-boats sunk in 1944
World War II shipwrecks in the Atlantic Ocean
U-boats sunk by mines
Maritime incidents in January 1944